Augsburg-Land is an electoral constituency (German: Wahlkreis) represented in the Bundestag. It elects one member via first-past-the-post voting. Under the current constituency numbering system, it is designated as constituency 253. It is located in southwestern Bavaria, comprising the Landkreis Augsburg district and most of the Aichach-Friedberg district.

Augsburg-Land was created for the inaugural 1949 federal election. Since 2013, it has been represented by Hansjörg Durz of the Christian Social Union (CSU).

Geography
Augsburg-Land is located in southwestern Bavaria. As of the 2021 federal election, it comprises the entirety of the Landkreis Augsburg district excluding the municipalities of Altenmünster and Königsbrunn, and the entirety of the Aichach-Friedberg district excluding the municipality of Inchenhofen and the Verwaltungsgemeinschaften of Aindling, Kühbach, and Pöttmes.

History
Augsburg-Land was created in 1949. In the 1949 election, it was Bavaria constituency 42 in the numbering system. In the 1953 through 1961 elections, it was number 237. In the 1965 through 1998 elections, it was number 239. In the 2002 and 2005 elections, it was number 254. Since the 2009 election, it has been number 253.

Originally, the constituency comprised the districts of Landkreis Augsburg, Friedberg, Krumbach, and Wertingen. In the 1965 through 1972 elections, it lost the Krumbach district while gaining the Schwabmünchen district. In the 1976 through 1994 elections, it comprised the districts of Landkreis Augsburg and Aichach-Friedberg. In the 1998 election, it lost the municipality of Königsbrunn from Landkreis Augsburg as well as the municipality of Inchenhofen and the Verwaltungsgemeinschaften of Kühbach and Pöttmes from the Aichach-Friedberg district. In the 2005 election, it further lost the Verwaltungsgemeinschaft of Aindling. In the 2021 election, it lost the municipality of Altenmünster from Landkreis Augsburg.

Members
The constituency has been held continuously by the Christian Social Union (CSU) since its creation. It was first represented by Josef Oesterle from 1949 to 1961, followed by Walter Althammer from 1961 to 1987. Eduard Oswald was representative from 1987 to 2013. Hansjörg Durz was elected in 2013, and re-elected in 2017 and 2021.

Election results

2021 election

2017 election

2013 election

2009 election

References

Federal electoral districts in Bavaria
1949 establishments in West Germany
Constituencies established in 1949
Augsburg (district)
Aichach-Friedberg